KF Vllaznia Pozheran (Klubi Futbollistik Vllaznia Pozheran) is a football club based in Požaranje, Vitina, Kosovo. The club played in the top division of football in Kosovo, Football Superleague of Kosovo for first time in the 2017–18 season and ended up getting relegated after finishing in the last place.

History
Vllaznia Pozheran as a club was created in 1973.

Players

Current squad

Notes and references

Notes

References

Vllaznia Pozheran
Association football clubs established in 1973
Vllaznia Pozheran